Wolwekraal (also known as Borolo) is a settlement in Nkangala District Municipality in the Mpumalanga province of South Africa, 14 km south-west of Mdutjana.

Demographics
Some 30% of the people speak siSwati, the language of neighbouring Eswatini, with 26% speaking isiZulu, 10.3% isiNdebele, 10.2% Northern Sotho and 11.6% Xitsonga.

The following statistics are from the 2001 census.

Gender

Ethnic group

Age

References

Populated places in the Dr JS Moroka Local Municipality